F-15,063 is an orally active potential antipsychotic, and an antagonist at the D2/D3 receptors, partial agonist at the D4 receptor, and agonist at the 5-HT1A receptors. It has greater efficacy at the 5-HT1A receptors than other antipsychotics, such as clozapine, aripiprazole, and ziprasidone. This greater efficacy may lead to enhanced antipsychotic properties, as antipsychotics that lack 5-HT1A affinity are associated with increased risk of extrapyramidal symptoms, and lack of activity against the negative symptoms of schizophrenia.

As expression of immediate-early gene (IEG) in certain brain regions may represent markers of anti-psychotic activity, expression of immediate-early gene mRNA in the prefrontal cortex and striatum was measured. Treatment with F-15,063 resulted in induction of c-fos and fosB mRNA expression in the prefrontal cortex. In the striatum, F-15,063 treatment resulted in induction of all 
IEGs studied (c-fos, fosB, zif268, c-jun, junB, nor1, nur77, arc).

F-15,063 was tested in several animal models that predict antipsychotic activity to help determine the behavioral profile. Administration of F-15,063 blocked amphetamine and ketamine induced hyperlocomotion, but did not affect baseline, spontaneous locomotor activity. In addition, F-15,063 did not produce catalepsy, a side effect of other antipsychotics, such as haloperidol. This inhibition of catalepsy is 5-HT1A receptor mediated, as pretreatment with the 5-HT1A antagonist WAY-100635 reinstated catalepsy. The level of catalepsy did not increase with chronic dosing, and there was no evidence for serotonin syndrome at clinically relevant doses.

Plasma levels of F-15,063 decreased seven-fold 4 hours after oral administration, and 25-fold after 8 hours. Despite this, there was still a high (65%) level of central D2 occupancy at 4 hours, and it  retained its full antipsychotic potential at this time point. Even after 8 hours, F-15,063 still demonstrated some central D2 occupancy, and retained some antipsychotic activity.

References

Antipsychotics